Anna Regina is the capital of the Pomeroon-Supenaam Region of Guyana. Anna Regina stands on the Atlantic coast, northwest of the mouth of the Essequibo River, 19 km north of Adventure, and was established as a town in 1970. Its population was 2,064 in 2012. 

There has been a Dutch plantation at the site since the early 1800s. Later it changed ownership to an Englishman who had two daughters: Anna and Regina.

Anna Regina has a market, a community centre and a secondary school.  In June 2009 Republic Bank (Guyana) established a branch in the town.

A number of sites in Anna Regina have historical significance. In 1988, the Damon Monument was erected to honour Damon, a slave who was executed after protesting against the introduction of apprenticeship. Other sites include Damon's Cross, the Aurora Chimney and estate House, Anna Regina Bridge, Anna Regina Chimney, St. Bartholomew's Anglican Church and several Dutch tombs.

Mainstay Lake is 5 miles from Anna Regina.

See also
 Cheddi Jagan Bio Diversity Park

References

Populated places in Pomeroon-Supenaam